Edwin Ruthvin Bethune Jr. (born December 19, 1935), known as Ed Bethune, is an American lawyer and lobbyist in Washington, D.C., who was a Republican member of the United States House of Representatives from Arkansas from 1979-1985.

Early years, education, military, legal practice 
Bethune was born to Mr. and Mrs. Edwin Bethune Sr. in Pocahontas, Arkansas. He graduated in 1953 from Pocahontas High School. He was a Sergeant in the United States Marine Corps from 1954–1957, with service in South Korea.

After military service, Bethune obtained his Bachelor of Arts degree in 1961 from the University of Arkansas at Fayetteville, where he was a member of the Kappa Sigma fraternity. He received the Juris Doctor degree from the University of Arkansas School of Law in 1963 and was admitted to the Arkansas bar that same year.

Career
That year he began his practice in Pocahontas. In 1972, while he was living in Searcy north of Little Rock, he practiced with former Arkansas Republican Party chairman Odell Pollard, who served as his political mentor. Bethune also was admitted to practice before the United States Supreme Court.

He was a prosecuting attorney for the First Judicial District of Arkansas from 1970-1971. He was chairman of the Ninth District Federal Home Loan Bank Board from 1973-1976.

Political career

Campaign for state attorney general, 1972
In 1972, Bethune was the unsuccessful Republican nominee for Arkansas attorney general against the Democrat James Guy Tucker Jr.  Tucker defeated Bethune, 370,647 (60 percent) to 247,404 (40 percent).

Election to the U.S. House, 1978
Bethune was chosen in 1979 as the president of the U.S. House Republican freshman class. He was reelected with ease in 1980—he polled 159,148 votes (78.9 percent) to 42,278 (21 percent) for his Democratic opponent, Jacksonville Mayor James G. Reid.

Once in the House, Bethune made federal taxes and spending his chief concern.

Bethune opposed Reagan's proposal to sell AWACS fighter planes to Saudi Arabia, which was against the advice of Israel. Bethune joined Senators Bumpers and Pryor to veto a proposal to override Arkansas' 10 percent interest ceiling for retail loans.

Election of 1982
In 1982, a year of widespread election of Democrats, Bethune had a harder race. He did not begin campaigning until the final three weeks of the contest, as he had been confident of winning a third term. His opponent was the Democratic former state Senator Charles Lindbergh George Sr. (born ca. 1929), from Cabot. George was not the Democrats' first choice; party leaders failed to persuade Little Rock attorney Sandy Sidney McMath (born ca. 1942), the son of the former governor, Sidney Sanders McMath, to challenge Bethune.

Bethune survived the challenge and gained re-election: 96,775 (53.9 percent) to George's 82,913 (46.1 percent). It was his last election victory.

U.S. Senate campaign, 1984
In 1984, Bethune sought the Senate seat against the incumbent Senator Pryor. He was decisively defeated, with Pryor receiving 502,341 votes (57.3 percent) to Bethune's 373,615 (42.7 percent).

After leaving Congress, Bethune served from 1986-1988  as the Arkansas Republican Party state Chairman. He resisted suggestions that he run for governor in 1986, and the nomination went to Frank White.

See also

References

 Retrieved on 2008-04-01
Arkansas Gazette, November 5, 1972; October 23, 1981; November 29, 1981; March 31, 1982; May 9, 1982; July 31, 1982; August 1, 1982; October 24, 1982
Arkansas Democrat, August 10, 18, 20, 1982
Arkansas Outlook, Republican Party newspaper, September 1972; July 1978
John C. Topping Jr., ed., "1978 Election Preview"', Ripon Forum, September/October 1978, p. 11
Congressional Quarterly Weekly Report, February 15, 1978, p. 424; February 27, 1982, p. 362; October 14, 1978, p. 2804
https://web.archive.org/web/20070930135721/http://www.opensecrets.org/lobbyists/firmsum.asp?txtname=Ed+Bethune+&+Assoc&year=1999
https://web.archive.org/web/20070930121642/http://www.opensecrets.org/lobbyists/firmsum.asp?txtname=Ed+Bethune+&+Assoc&year=1998
http://partners.nytimes.com/library/politics/10tran.html
http://www.cnn.com/ALLPOLITICS/1997/01/10/gingrich.ethics/excerpts.shtml
https://archive.today/20130209115128/http://wired-vig.wired.com/culture/lifestyle/news/1997/01/1397
http://www.boston.com/news/nation/washington/articles/2004/10/09/delay_assails_panel_accusers/?rss_id=Boston+Globe+--+National+News
Election Statistics, 1972, 1978, 1980, 1982, and 1984, Little Rock: Secretary of State
http://ssdi.rootsweb.com/cgi-bin/ssdi.cgi
 

1935 births
People from Pocahontas, Arkansas
Federal Bureau of Investigation agents
United States Marines
Arkansas lawyers
University of Arkansas alumni
Arkansas Republican state chairmen
Living people
Candidates in the 1984 United States elections
American United Methodists
2020 United States presidential electors
Republican Party members of the United States House of Representatives from Arkansas
Members of Congress who became lobbyists